Granite Lake is a small lake in the Pacific Ranges of the Coast Mountains in southwestern British Columbia, Canada. It lies west of the south end of Horseshoe Lake.

References

External links

Lakes of British Columbia
Pacific Ranges
New Westminster Land District